WAUS (90.7 MHz) is a non-commercial FM radio station licensed to Berrien Springs, Michigan, and broadcasting to the Michiana and South Bend metropolitan area.  It is owned by Andrews University and airs a classical music radio format.  It carries NPR News or BBC News at the top of most hours with some religious programming on the weekends.

History
WAUS first signed on the air on January 10, 1971.  It was originally powered at 17,000 watts, about half its current output.  The original station manager was Mike Mottler, with Carsten Thomsen as the operations director.

But Andrews University traces its involvement in broadcasting back to the 1920s.  According to its website, an experimental radio station with the call sign 8AZ went on the air at Emmanuel Missionary College (Andrews University's previous name) in 1921.  It called itself "The Radio Lighthouse," airing religious and general programs.  8AZ could be heard in those early days of broadcasting around Michigan and Indiana, with some reports of it being picked up in Europe, Hawaii and New Zealand.  Due to the Great Depression, the funds to run the station ran low, and the college sold it to John Fetzer, who moved it to Kalamazoo.

In 1967, Andrews University began planning for a new non-commercial FM station.  Robert E. Upton of the Whirlpool Corporation headed up a capital campaign.  Built with money raised from the community and a substantial amount provided by John Fetzer, radio station WAUS signed on the air on January 10, 1971.  By 1980, the power had been increased to its current 50,000 watts.

References

Sources
Michiguide.com - WAUS History

External links
WAUS Website

AUS
Classical music radio stations in the United States
Andrews University
Seventh-day Adventist media
NPR member stations
Radio stations established in 1995